Blackley and Broughton ( and )  is a constituency represented in the House of Commons of the UK Parliament by Graham Stringer. He was first elected in 1997 for the former Manchester Blackley and prior to this was Leader of Manchester City Council. The constituency covers north Manchester and east Salford.

Boundaries

The City of Manchester wards of Charlestown, Cheetham, Crumpsall, Harpurhey, and Higher Blackley, and the City of Salford wards of Broughton and Kersal.

Formed following the Boundary Commission for England's review of parliamentary representation in Greater Manchester, this seat is a cross-border constituency with electoral wards from Salford City Council and Manchester City Council. This redrawn constituency uses the River Irwell as the eastern border with Salford and Eccles. The constituency of Blackley and Broughton is the successor seat to Manchester Blackley.

This is one of only five seats in the UK that each cover two cities, in this case Manchester and Salford. The others in England are Cities of London and Westminster in Central London, and Morley and Outwood in West Yorkshire, which includes parts of Leeds and Wakefield. In Northern Ireland the two cities of Newry and Armagh are included in the constituency of that name, and Belfast West includes part of the city of Lisburn.

Constituency profile
The seat covers a mostly residential area, major roads with many small parks and two large green spaces, Heaton Park which is one of the largest municipal parks in Europe and hosts the annual Parklife concert,  and Boggart Hole Clough, a large ancient woodland in Blackley towards the east. A diverse constituency which stretches from the city centre's outskirts (including Manchester Arena and the Strangeways Prison), featuring a large Asian population in Cheetham and Orthodox Jewish populations in parts of Crumpsall and the  Salford suburbs of Broughton and Kersal.  There is also an above-average number of Irish (the Irish World Heritage Centre is based here) and other European residents.

Blackley itself is a mostly owner occupied, suburban residential area at the northern half of the seat, while the inner-city Harpurhey district has a high proportion of social housing and has faced problems with deprivation, and is mostly white working-class. More affluent areas include Higher Kersal and the Broughton Park area, with leafy roads and large detached houses.

The Constituency narrowly voted Leave in the European referendum in 2016 and the incumbent, Graham Stringer was a prominent Vote Leave.

History
Results of the Incumbent party

Most of the area has been held by Labour since 1964.

Results of other parties

In 2019, the Conservatives came second with 24.6% vote share  a 3% increase again from 2017. 
The Conservatives came second in 2017, with 21.6% of the vote, a 7% increase on the 2015 election.

A March 2017 by-election saw the Conservatives win the ward of Kersal within the constituency from Labour and in the 2018 Local Elections another Conservative candidate was elected meaning the Conservatives now hold 2/3 Salford City Council seats in the area.

The 2015 general election saw much more than the national average swing (+16.5%) to the UKIP candidate (compared with 9.5% nationwide). UKIP came second overall.

Turnout 
At the 2019 General Election, turnout fell by 3.3% to 52.8%, for the first time since the constituency was created in 2010, having risen from 49.7% in 2010 and to 56.1% of electors in 2017. In 2019 the constituency had the 5th lowest turnout in the country, and the lowest of all the Manchester seats.

Members of Parliament

Elections

Elections in the 2010s

See also
List of parliamentary constituencies in Greater Manchester

Notes

References

External links
nomis Constituency Profile

Politics of Salford
Parliamentary constituencies in Manchester
Parliamentary constituencies in Greater Manchester
Constituencies of the Parliament of the United Kingdom established in 2010